A barracuda is a large, predatory, ray-finned fish known for its fearsome appearance and ferocious behaviour. The barracuda is a saltwater fish of the genus Sphyraena, the only genus in the family Sphyraenidae, which was named by Constantine Samuel Rafinesque in 1815. It is found in tropical and subtropical oceans worldwide ranging from the eastern border of the Atlantic Ocean to the Red Sea, on its western border the Caribbean Sea, and in tropical areas of the Pacific Ocean. Barracudas reside near the top of the water and near coral reefs and sea grasses. Barracudas are targeted by sport-fishing enthusiasts.

Etymology 
The common name "barracuda" is derived from Spanish, with the original word being of possibly Cariban origin.

Description 

Barracuda are snake-like in appearance, with prominent, sharp-edged, fang-like teeth, much like piranha, all of different sizes, set in sockets of their large jaws. They have large, pointed heads with an underbite in many species. Their gill covers have no spines and are covered with small scales. Their two dorsal fins are widely separated, with the anterior fin having five spines, and the posterior fin having one spine and nine soft rays. The posterior dorsal fin is similar in size to the anal fin and is situated above it. The lateral line is prominent and extends straight from head to tail. The spinous dorsal fin is placed above the pelvic fins and is normally retracted in a groove. The caudal fin is moderately forked with its posterior edge double-curved and is set at the end of a stout peduncle. The pectoral fins are placed low on the sides. The swim bladder is large, allowing for minimal energy expenditure while cruising or remaining idle.

In most cases, barracuda are dark gray, dark green, white, or blue on the upper body, with silvery sides and a chalky-white belly. Coloration varies somewhat between species. For some species, irregular black spots or a row of darker cross-bars occur on each side. Their fins may be yellowish or dusky. Barracudas live primarily in oceans, but certain species, such as the great barracuda, live in brackish water. Due to similarities, sometimes Barracuda is compared with freshwater Pike, though the major difference between the two is that Barracuda has two separate dorsal fins with a forked tail, unlike the freshwater pike.

Some species grow quite large (up to 65 inches or 165 cm in length), such as Sphyraena sphyraena, found in the Mediterranean Sea and eastern Atlantic; Sphyraena picudilla, ranging on the Atlantic coast of tropical America from North Carolina to Brazil and reaching Bermuda. Other barracuda species are found around the world. Examples are Sphyraena argentea, found from Puget Sound southwards to Cabo San Lucas, Sphyraena jello, from the seas of India and the Malay Peninsula and Archipelago.

Species
The barracuda genus Sphyraena contains 29 species:
 Sphyraena acutipinnis F. Day, 1876 (Sharpfin barracuda)
 Sphyraena afra W. K. H. Peters, 1844 (Guinean barracuda)
 Sphyraena arabiansis E. M. Abdussamad, Ratheesh, Thangaraja, Bineesh & D. Prakashan, 2015 (Arabian barracuda) 
 Sphyraena argentea Girard, 1854  (Pacific barracuda)
 Sphyraena barracuda (G. Edwards, 1771) (Great barracuda)
 Sphyraena borealis DeKay, 1842 (Northern sennet)
 Sphyraena chrysotaenia Klunzinger, 1884 (Yellowstripe barracuda)
 Sphyraena ensis D. S. Jordan & C. H. Gilbert, 1882 (Mexican barracuda)
 Sphyraena flavicauda Rüppell, 1838 (Yellowtail barracuda)
 Sphyraena forsteri G. Cuvier, 1829 (Bigeye barracuda)
 Sphyraena guachancho G. Cuvier, 1829 (Guachanche barracuda)
 Sphyraena helleri O. T. Jenkins, 1901 (Heller's barracuda)
 Sphyraena iburiensis Doiuchi & Nakabo, 2005
 Sphyraena idiastes Heller & Snodgrass, 1903 (Pelican barracuda)
 Sphyraena intermedia Pastore, 2009 
 Sphyraena japonica Bloch & J. G. Schneider, 1801 (Japanese barracuda)
 Sphyraena jello G. Cuvier, 1829 (Pickhandle barracuda)
 Sphyraena lucasana T. N. Gill, 1863 (Lucas barracuda)
 Sphyraena novaehollandiae Günther, 1860 (Australian barracuda)
 Sphyraena obtusata G. Cuvier, 1829 (Obtuse barracuda)
 Sphyraena picudilla Poey, 1860 (Southern sennet)
 Sphyraena pinguis Günther, 1874 (Red barracuda)
 Sphyraena putnamae D. S. Jordan & Seale, 1905 (Sawtooth barracuda)
 Sphyraena qenie Klunzinger, 1870 (Blackfin barracuda)
 Sphyraena sphyraena (Linnaeus, 1758) (European barracuda)
 Sphyraena tome Fowler, 1903
 Sphyraena viridensis G. Cuvier, 1829 (Yellowmouth barracuda)
 Sphyraena waitii W. Ogilby, 1908

Behavior and diet

Adults of most species are more or less solitary, while young and half-grown fish frequently congregate. 

Barracudas prey primarily on fish (which may include some as large as themselves). Common prey fish include jacks, grunts, groupers, snappers, small tunas, mullets, killifishes, herrings, and anchovies; often by simply biting them in half. They kill and consume larger prey by tearing chunks out of their prey. They also seem to consume smaller species of sustenance that are in front of them. Barracuda species are often seen competing against mackerel, needle fish and sometimes even dolphins for prey.

Barracudas are usually found swimming in saltwater searching for schools of plankton-feeding fish. Their silver and elongated bodies make them difficult for prey to detect, and even more difficult to be seen when viewing them head-on. Barracudas depend heavily on their eyesight when they are out hunting. When hunting, they tend to notice everything that has an unusual color, reflection, or movement. Once a barracuda targets an intended prey item, its long tail and matching anal and dorsal fins enable it to move with swift bursts of speed to attack its prey before it can escape. Barracudas generally attack schools of fish, speeding at them head first and biting at them with their jaws. When barracudas age, they tend to swim alone. However, there are times where they tend to stay with the pack. Barracudas will sometimes swim in groups. In this case, they can relocate schools of fish into compact areas or lead them into shallow water to more easily feed on them.

Interactions with humans 
Some species of barracuda are reputed to be dangerous to swimmers. Barracudas are scavengers, and may mistake snorkelers for large predators, following them hoping to eat the remains of their prey. Swimmers have reported being bitten by barracudas, but such incidents are rare and possibly caused by poor visibility. Large barracudas can be encountered in muddy shallows on rare occasion. Barracudas may mistake things that glint and shine for prey. One incident reported a barracuda jumping out of water and injuring a kayaker, but Jason Schratwieser, conservation director of the International Game Fish Association, said that the wound could have been caused by a houndfish.

As food 
Barracudas are popular both as food and game fish. They are most often eaten as fillets or steaks. Larger species, such as the great barracuda, have been implicated in cases of ciguatera food poisoning. Those who have been diagnosed with this type of food poisoning display symptoms of gastrointestinal discomfort, limb weakness, and an inability to differentiate hot from cold effectively.

West Africans smoke them for use in soups and sauces. Smoking protects the soft flesh from disintegrating in the broth and gives it a smoky flavour.

In popular culture
The "Blue Barracudas" were a team on the 90's Nickelodeon gameshow Legends of the Hidden Temple.

The barracuda prominently appeared in the 2003 Disney/Pixar animated film Finding Nemo, in the beginning of the film, when it attacks the clownfishes Marlin (Albert Brooks), Coral (Elizabeth Perkins), Nemo (Alexander Gould) and their eggs who lives in the sea anemone by the drop off in the Great Barrier Reef in Australia. Before the main titles in the film and in the 3D version release in 2012, the barracuda closes its teeth and the bottom lip is shown in the film. Nemo likely would not have survived into adulthood due to his small fin had the barracuda not eaten all other eggs. (The same barracuda also appeared as an easter egg in the 2019 Disney/Pixar animated film Toy Story 4. It was stuffed and mounted in display in the Second Chances antique store.)

"Barracuda" is the title of a 1977 hit song by American rock band Heart blasting Mushroom Records for a damaging publicity stunt.

The Pokémon Arrokuda and its evolution Barraskewda (both introduced to the franchise in Pokémon Sword and Shield) are based on the barracuda.

The Plymouth Barracuda is a two-door pony car that was manufactured by Plymouth from 1964 to 1974.

Gallery

References

External links 

 Ichthyological Bulletin; No. 3: The fishes of the Family Sphyraenidae in the Western Indian Ocean

Sport fish
 
Taxa named by Jacob Theodor Klein
Fish of Pakistan
Fish of India
Fish of Bangladesh
Fish of Malaysia
Extant Eocene first appearances
Fish of Saudi Arabia